Sansan may refer to:
Sansan, Gers,  commune in the Gers department, France
Sansan, Iran, village in Zanjan Province, Iran
SanSan, metropolitan area in California
Sansan (Go), position in the board game of Go

See also
San San (disambiguation)